Michael Færk Christensen (born 14 February 1986 in Hobro) is a Danish professional racing cyclist.

Major results

External links 

1986 births
Living people
Cyclists at the 2008 Summer Olympics
Danish male cyclists
Olympic cyclists of Denmark
Olympic silver medalists for Denmark
People from Hobro
UCI Track Cycling World Champions (men)
Olympic medalists in cycling
Medalists at the 2008 Summer Olympics
Danish track cyclists
Sportspeople from the North Jutland Region